"Homeward Bound" is a song by the American music duo Simon & Garfunkel, released as a single on January 19, 1966, by Columbia Records. It was written by Paul Simon and produced by Bob Johnston. Simon wrote the song during his time in England, possibly while waiting for a train at Widnes railway station in the northwest of England.

"Homeward Bound" appears on the duo's third studio album, Parsley, Sage, Rosemary and Thyme (1966), although it was recorded during the sessions for their second album, Sounds of Silence and included on that album in the UK. It was their second single, the follow-up to their breakthrough hit "The Sound of Silence". "Homeward Bound" performed very well domestically, peaking at number five on the Billboard Hot 100, remaining on the charts for 12 weeks. It reached number two in Canada, and was a top-five hit in the Netherlands.

A live version of "Homeward Bound" is included on the 1972 compilation Simon and Garfunkel's Greatest Hits. Simon and Garfunkel performed it at their 1981 reunion the Concert in Central Park.

Writing

"Homeward Bound" was written by Paul Simon after he returned to England in early 1964. He had previously spent time in Essex, and he became a nightly fixture at the Railway Hotel in Brentwood, beginning that April. He was reeling from his brief period in the folk scene in Greenwich Village, New York, and the recording of his first album with Art Garfunkel, Wednesday Morning, 3 A.M., which he anticipated would be a failure. 

During his time in England, Simon met Kathy Chitty, who was working as a ticket-taker at the club. The two hit it off instantly, but it became clear that Simon desired to perform in London, resulting in an emotional farewell. Following a performance in Widnes, Simon was dropped off at Widnes railway station for a train to his next gig in Humberside. He had been missing Chitty and he began to write "Homeward Bound" on a scrap of paper. A plaque commemorating the song is displayed on the Widnes station platform.

Other locations for the writing of the song have been suggested. Simon's friend Geoff Speed, with whom Simon stayed in Liverpool in September 1965, said he heard Simon writing the song when he was staying at his home. Speed then dropped him at Widnes railway station; he said it was likely that Simon wrote one verse in Liverpool and the chorus in Wigan, and finished the song at the station. In 2016, Simon said he wrote the song in a railway station near Liverpool, and said it might have been Warrington.

Chitty is mentioned in several other Simon & Garfunkel songs, most notably "Kathy's Song" and "America". In the 1969 song "The Boxer", Simon alludes to a railway station, a possible reference to "Homeward Bound".  

Billboard described the song as an "interesting off-beat rhythm number."  Cash Box described the single as a "catchy, low-down blues-tinged folk-styled ode about a wanderin’ lad who is finally going back to his hometown gal" that "should speedily move up the hitsville path."

Charts

Weekly charts

Year-end charts

Certifications

Popular culture
Simon performed "Homeward Bound" with George Harrison on the November 20, 1976 episode of Saturday Night Live. Both sang some of their solo hits, and also performed "Here Comes the Sun" together. Their duet of "Homeward Bound" appeared on the benefit album Nobody's Child: Romanian Angel Appeal.
A video of the duet with Harrison from SNL was also included in a DVD release titled "Paul Simon and Friends". In May of 2007 the Library of Congress invited musicians and artists to perform together in Washington, D.C., to honor Paul Simon who received the first Gershwin Prize for Popular Song. Alison Krauss, Stevie Wonder, Lyle Lovett, Ladysmith Black Mambazo, Marc Anthony, Art Garfunkel and others all performed.
An in-universe karaoke performance of the song features prominently in the climax of the second season finale of the television series The Leftovers.

See also
 List of train songs

Notes

References

Sources

External links
 
 

1966 songs
1966 singles
Songs written by Paul Simon
Simon & Garfunkel songs
Burl Ives songs
Richard Barnes (musician) songs
The Beau Brummels songs
Cher songs
Petula Clark songs
Ronan Keating songs
Jack Jones (singer) songs
Glen Campbell songs
Song recordings produced by Bob Johnston
Columbia Records singles
Songs about trains
Songs about London
Number-one singles in New Zealand